Gediminas Maceina (born 28 August 1984) is a Lithuanian professional basketball player for CBet Prienai of the Lithuanian Basketball League.

Achievements 
 2008 year: LKL Bronze medal
 2011 year: BBL Champion (Challenge cup)

References

External links 
 Gediminas Maceina LKL.lt profile (English and Lithuanian)
 Gediminas Maceina BBL.net profile (English)

1984 births
Living people
Lithuanian men's basketball players
People from Prienai
Point guards